The second USS Astoria (CL/CA-34) was a  of the United States Navy that participated in both the Battle of the Coral Sea and the Battle of Midway, but was then sunk in August 1942, at the Battle of Savo Island.

Immediately after the months-long Guadalcanal campaign ended in February 1943, the remaining ships of the class would go through major overhauls to lessen top-heaviness due to new electrical and radar systems and advanced anti-aircraft weaponry. In doing so the ships took on a new appearance, most notably in the bridge.

Construction and commissioning
Astoria was laid down on 1 September 1930, at the Puget Sound Navy Yard. Such ships, with a limit of 10,000 tons standard displacement and 8-inch calibre main guns may be referred to as "treaty cruisers." Originally classified a light cruiser, because of her thin armor, she was reclassified, after being laid down, a heavy cruiser, because of her 8-inch guns. The term "heavy cruiser" was not defined until the London Naval Treaty in 1930. Launched on 16 December 1933, sponsored by Miss Leila C. McKay (a descendant of Alexander McKay, a member of the John Jacob Astor expedition that founded Astoria, Oregon), and commissioned on 28 April 1934, Captain Edmund S. Root in command.

During the summer of 1934, Astoria conducted a lengthy shakedown cruise, in the course of which she voyaged extensively in the Pacific. In addition to the Hawaiian Islands, the heavy cruiser also visited American Samoa; Fiji; Sydney, Australia; and Nouméa on the island of New Caledonia. She returned to San Francisco on 26 September 1934.

Inter-war period
Between the fall of 1934 and February 1937, she operated as a unit of Cruiser Division 7 (CruDiv 7), Scouting Force, based at San Pedro, California. In February 1937, the warship was reassigned to CruDiv 6, though she continued to serve as an element of Scouting Force based at San Pedro. In both assignments, she carried out normal peacetime maneuvers, the culmination of which came in the annual fleet problem that brought the entire United States Fleet together in a single, vast exercise.

Special duty: Hiroshi Saito's ashes
At the beginning of 1939, Fleet Problem XX concentrated the fleet in the West Indies, and at its conclusion Astoria, Richmond Kelly Turner commanding, made a hasty departure from Culebra Island on 3 March 1939 and headed for Chesapeake Bay. After taking on a capacity load of stores and fuel at Norfolk, Virginia, the heavy cruiser proceeded north to Annapolis, Maryland, where she embarked the remains of the former Japanese Ambassador to the United States, the late Hiroshi Saito, for the voyage to Japan, a gesture that expressed America's gratitude to the Japanese for returning the body of the late United States Ambassador to Japan, Edgar Bancroft, in the cruiser  in 1926. Astoria sailed from Annapolis on 18 March 1939, accompanied by Naokichi Kitazawa, Second Secretary of the Japanese Embassy in Washington.

Arriving in the Panama Canal Zone soon thereafter, where "various high officials and a delegation from the Japanese colony in Panama paid their respects to Saito's ashes," Astoria got underway for Hawaii on 24 March. She moored at Honolulu on 4 April, the same day that Madame Saito and her two daughters arrived on board the passenger liner . Two days later, the heavy cruiser proceeded westward across the Pacific.

The warship fired a 21-gun salute which was returned by the light cruiser . American sailors carried the ceremonial urn ashore that afternoon, and funeral ceremonies took place the following morning.

After the solemn state funeral, the Japanese showered lavish hospitality on the visiting cruiser and her men. Captain Turner, for his part, pleased Ambassador to Japan Joseph C. Grew by his diplomatic role in the proceedings; the naval attaché in Tokyo, Captain Harold Medberry Bemis, later recorded that the choice of Turner for that delicate mission was "particularly fortunate...." In grateful appreciation of American sympathy and courtesy a pagoda was later presented by Hirosi Saito's wife and child. That pagoda is located in front of Luce Hall at the United States Naval Academy.

Astoria sailed for Shanghai, China, on 26 April, and reached her destination on the morning of the 29th. She remained at Shanghai until 1 May. After receiving Admiral Harry E. Yarnell, Commander in Chief, Asiatic Fleet, on board for a courtesy call that morning, Astoria put to sea for Hong Kong in the afternoon. Following the visit to Hong Kong, Astoria stopped briefly in the Philippines before continuing on to Guam. Soon thereafter, Astoria joined the search for the noted author and adventurer Richard Halliburton, and the companions with whom he had attempted the voyage from Hong Kong to San Francisco in his Chinese junk, Sea Dragon.

Reassigned to Pearl Harbor

Assigned to the Hawaiian Detachment in October 1939, Astoria changed home ports from San Pedro to Pearl Harbor. The following spring, she participated in Fleet Problem XXI, the last of those major annual exercises that brought the entire United States Fleet together to be conducted before World War II engulfed the United States. The maneuvers took place in Hawaiian waters, and, instead of returning to the west coast at their conclusion, the bulk of the fleet joined Astoria and the Hawaiian Detachment in making Pearl Harbor its base of operations.

On 2 April 1941, Astoria departed Pearl Harbor for the west coast of the United States. She reached Long Beach, California, on 8 April and entered the Mare Island Navy Yard on the 13th. During her refit, she received quadruple-mount /75 cal anti-aircraft guns and a pedestal fitted at her foremast in anticipation of the imminent installation of the new air-search radar. Emerging from the yard on 11 July 1941, the heavy cruiser sailed for Long Beach on the 16th. Later shifting to San Pedro, Astoria sailed for Pearl Harbor on 24 July 1941.

Following her return to Hawaii on 31 July, Astoria operated between Oahu and Midway through early September. That autumn, the specter of German raiders on the prowl in the Pacific prompted the Navy to convoy its ships bound for Guam and the Philippines. Astoria escorted  to Manila and thence to Guam, before returning to Pearl Harbor on 29 October. Local patrols and training, alternated with upkeep in port, occupied Astoria during the final five weeks of peace.

World War II
After rising tensions in the Pacific intensified his concern over the defenses of his outlying bases at the beginning of December 1941, Admiral Husband E. Kimmel, Commander in Chief, Pacific Fleet/United States Fleet, ordered reinforcements, in the form of Marine Corps planes, to be ferried to Wake Island and Midway. Once the task force reached open sea, Lexingtons air group and the 18 Vought SB2U-3 Vindicators from Marine Scout Bombing Squadron 231 (VMSB-231) bound for Midway landed on the carrier's flight deck.

At 0900 the following day, the heavy cruiser , flagship of Vice Admiral Wilson Brown, Commander, Scouting Force, joined up with TF 12, and Brown assumed command. Its ferry mission canceled, TF 12 spent the next few days searching an area to the southwest of Oahu, "with instructions to intercept and destroy any enemy ship in the vicinity of Pearl Harbor...."

The cruiser reentered Pearl Harbor with the Lexington force on 13 December, but she returned to sea on the 16th to rendezvous with and screen a convoy, the oiler  and the seaplane tender  – the abortive Wake Island relief expedition. When that island fell to the Japanese on 23 December, however, the force was recalled. Astoria remained at sea until the afternoon of 29 December, when she arrived back at Oahu. When Astoria was moored in Pearl Harbor, she had about 40 sailors from the battleship  transferred to her ranks. They were survivors of 7 December, when California was sunk at Berth F4 on Battleship Row.

On 11 January, the Japanese submarine I-6 torpedoed the carrier, forcing her retirement to Pearl Harbor. Astoria and her colleagues in the task force saw the crippled carrier safely into port on the morning of 13 January 1942.

On the afternoon of the 21st, however, TF 11 received orders to rendezvous with Neches, and then to conduct an air raid on Wake Island, followed by a surface bombardment "if practicable." Without the oiler's precious cargo of fuel, TF 11 could not execute the planned strike. Ordered back to Oahu, the task force reentered Pearl Harbor on the morning of 24 January.

Southwestern Pacific cruise: TF 17 (USS Yorktown)
Initially, TF 17's orders called for operations in the vicinity of Canton Island. However, after the Japanese discovered TF 11 on its way to attack their important new base at Rabaul and sent a determined raid which hit the Lexington task force off Bougainville on 20 February, Vice Admiral Brown asked for a second carrier to strengthen his force for another crack at Rabaul. Accordingly, TF 17 received orders to aid Brown in that attempt, and Astoria steamed with Yorktown to a rendezvous with TF 11 that took place southwest of the New Hebrides on 6 March.

The combined force, under Brown, stood toward Rabaul until the Japanese landings at Lae and Salamaua, New Guinea prompted a change of plans. Late on 8 March, Brown and his staff decided to shift objectives and attack the two new enemy beachheads by launching planes from the Gulf of Papua in the south and sending them across the width of New Guinea to the targets on the northern coast. The heavy cruiser and the other warships of that force carried out a threefold mission. They secured the carriers' right flank during their operations in the Gulf of Papua; they shielded Port Moresby from any new enemy thrust; and they covered the arrival of Army troops at Nouméa.

The raids on Lae and Salamaua, conducted by 104 planes from Yorktown and Lexington on 10 March 1942 proved devastating to the Japanese, causing heavy damage to their already depleted amphibious forces by sinking three transports and a minesweeper, as well as damaging a light cruiser, a large minelayer, three destroyers and a seaplane carrier. More importantly, the attack delayed the Japanese timetable for conquest in the Solomons and prompted them to send aircraft carriers to cover the operation. The delay, which also allowed the United States Navy time to marshal its forces, coupled with the dispatch of Japanese carriers led to the confrontation in the Coral Sea.

Battle of the Coral Sea
Astoria rejoined TF 17 on 14 March and patrolled the Coral Sea for the rest of March. Arriving on 1 April, the cruiser remained there only briefly, returning to sea the following day. The warship marched and counter-marched across the Coral Sea for two weeks before TF 17 headed for Tongatapu, where she and the Yorktown force spent the week of 20–27 April.

About this time, intelligence reports convinced Admiral Chester Nimitz that the enemy sought to take Port Moresby, on the southeastern coast of New Guinea, and he resolved to thwart those designs. He sent TF 11, built around a refurbished Lexington and led by a new commander, Rear Admiral Aubrey W. Fitch, to join Fletcher's TF 17 in the Coral Sea. Astoria returned to sea with TF 17 on 27 April to rendezvous with TF 11. The two carrier task forces met in the eastern Coral Sea early on the morning of 1 May.

Late in the afternoon of 3 May, Rear Admiral Fletcher received word of the Japanese occupation of Tulagi in the Solomons. Astoria screened Yorktown the following day as the carrier launched three raids on the enemy ships off Tulagi.

Next came a two-day lull on 5–6 May, during which TF 17 fueled in preparation for the impending battle. Astoria screened Yorktown on the 7th as her planes joined those from Lexington in searches and strikes that located and sank the Japanese carrier . Japanese planes, however, located and sank the oiler  and her escort, Sims.

Enemy planes found TF 17 just before 1100 that morning and quickly charged to the attack. Almost simultaneously, planes from Yorktown and Lexington deployed to attack the enemy task force.

Torpedo bombers opened the first phase of the attack, while torpedo and dive bombers coordinated attacks in the second phase.

The battle action on 8 May, as Astorias executive officer, Commander Chauncey R. Crutcher, recounted, "was short and was accompanied by intense anti-aircraft fire against a determined enemy...." Astoria assisted in putting up a protective barrage over Lexington at the outset, and after the task forces separated, she shifted to the anti-aircraft umbrella over Yorktown. Her gunners claimed to have splashed at least four enemy planes in the attack that "seemed to end as suddenly as it had started."

At about 1245, Lexington – heavily damaged though apparently in satisfactory condition afloat and underway – suffered severe internal explosions that rang her death knell. Fires raged out of control and, by 1630, her engines stopped. Ninety minutes later, Captain Frederick C. Sherman ordered the ship abandoned.

That force reached its destination on 12 May but remained only overnight. On the 13th, she and the other warships got underway for Pearl Harbor, via Tongatapu, and arrived at Oahu on 27 May.

Battle of Midway
The heavy cruiser remained in Pearl Harbor only until the 30th. On that day, she returned to sea with the hastily repaired Yorktown to prepare to meet yet another major thrust by the Japanese fleet – this one aimed at Midway. Air searches from that island spotted the enemy's Midway Occupation Force – made up of transports, minesweepers, and two seaplane carriers – early on 3 June, but the enemy carrier force eluded detection until early in the morning of the 4th. The heavy cruiser screened Yorktown as the carrier began launching strike aircraft at about 0840. While the planes droned off to make their contribution to the destruction of the Japanese carrier force, Astoria and her colleagues prepared for the inevitable Japanese reply.

The counterstroke, however, did not come until a few minutes before noon as Yorktowns victorious aviators began to return to their ship. 18 Aichi D3A1 "Val" dive bombers came in to attack the carrier. Grumman F4F-4 Wildcat fighters from Fighting Squadron 3 (VF-3) accounted for 10 of the intruders, but the remaining eight managed to penetrate the combat air patrol (CAP). Astoria teamed up with Portland and the screening destroyers to splash another two of the attackers. The remaining six, however, succeeded in attacking Yorktown, and three of those scored hits. One of the three hit the carrier's stack, causing fires in her uptakes that literally smoked Rear Admiral Fletcher and his staff out of flag plot. At about 1310, he shifted his flag to Astoria.

Yorktowns damage control parties worked feverishly, and by 1340 she was again underway under her own power, albeit at only . At about 1430, the second attack – composed of 10 Nakajima B5N2 "Kate" torpedo bombers escorted by six Mitsubishi A6M Zero fighters – came in and eluded the weak CAP. Astoria and the other ships of the screen attempted to discourage attacks from four different directions by bringing every gun to bear and firing them into the sea to throw curtains of water into the path of the attackers. Nevertheless, four of the "Kates" made good their attack and released their torpedoes within . Yorktown dodged two, but the other two scored hits which stopped the ship again. By 1500, the order to abandon ship went out. Astoria called away lifeboats to assist in the rescue of Yorktowns survivors. That night, the heavy cruiser retired east ward with the rest of the task force to await dawn, while a single destroyer, Hughes, stood by the stricken carrier.

The following day broke with Yorktown still afloat, and efforts began to salvage the battered warship. Though the Japanese had abandoned the Midway attack and had begun retiring toward Japan, submarine  had been given orders to sink Yorktown. After a 24-hour search, the enemy submarine found her quarry on the 6th and attacked with a spread of four torpedoes. One torpedo missed completely, two passed under destroyer Hammann alongside the carrier and detonated in Yorktowns hull, while the fourth broke Hammanns back. The destroyer sank in less than four minutes. The carrier remained afloat until early on the morning of the 7th. At about dawn, she finally rolled over and sank.

Astoria remained as flagship for TF 17, as it operated north of Midway, until shortly after midday on 8 June when TF 11 arrived on the scene, and Rear Admiral Fletcher transferred his flag to Saratoga, On 11 June, Admiral Nimitz – satisfied that the major Japanese thrust had been thwarted – ordered his carrier task forces back to Hawaii, and Astoria reentered Pearl Harbor with them on 13 June. During the early summer of 1942, she completed repairs and alterations at the Pearl Harbor Navy Yard and carried out training in the Hawaiian operating area.

The Solomons (Battle of Savo Island)

By the beginning of August, Astoria had been reassigned to Task Group 62.3 (TG 62.3), Fire Support Group L, to cover the Guadalcanal-Tulagi landings. Early on the morning of 7 August, the heavy cruiser entered the waters between Guadalcanal and Florida Islands in the southern Solomons. Throughout the day, she supported the Marines as they landed on Guadalcanal and several smaller islands nearby. The Japanese launched air counterattacks on the 7th–8th, and Astoria helped to defend the transports from those attacks.

On the night of 8/9 August, a Japanese force of seven cruisers and a destroyer under Vice Admiral Gunichi Mikawa sneaked by Savo Island and attacked the American ships. The Japanese came through the channel to the west of Savo Island and opened fire on Chicago –  force first at about 0140 on the morning of the 9th, hitting both cruisers with torpedoes and shells. They then divided – inadvertently – into two separate groups and turned generally northeast, passing on either side of Astoria and her two consorts. The enemy cruisers began firing on that force at about 0150, and the heavy cruiser began return fire immediately. She ceased fire briefly because her commanding officer temporarily mistook the Japanese force for friendly ships but soon resumed shooting. Astoria took no hits in the first four Japanese salvoes, but the fifth ripped into her superstructure, turning her into an inferno amidships. In quick succession, enemy shells put her No. 1 turret out of action and started a serious fire in the plane hangar that burned brightly and provided the enemy with a self-illuminated target.

From that moment on, deadly accurate Japanese gunfire pounded her unmercifully, and she began to lose speed. Turning to the right to avoid Quincys fire at about 0201, Astoria reeled as a succession of enemy shells struck her aft of the foremast. Soon thereafter, Quincy veered across Astorias bow, blazing fiercely from bow to stern. Astoria put her rudder over hard left and avoided a collision while her battered sister ship passed aft, to starboard. As the warship turned, s searchlight illuminated her, and men on deck passed the order to No. 2 turret to shoot out the offending light.

Astoria lost steering control on the bridge at about 0225, shifted control to central station, and began steering a zig-zag course south. Before she made much progress, though, the heavy cruiser lost all power. Fortunately, the Japanese chose that exact instant to withdraw. By 0300, nearly 400 men, including about 70 wounded and many dead, were assembled on the forecastle deck.

Suffering from the effects of at least 65 hits, Astoria fought for her life. A bucket brigade battled the blaze on the gun deck and the starboard passage forward from that deck, and the wounded were moved to the captain's cabin, where doctors and corpsmen proceeded with their care. Eventually, however, the deck beneath grew hot and forced the wounded back to the forecastle. The bucket brigade made steady headway, driving the fire aft on the starboard side of the gun deck, while a gasoline handy-billy rigged over the side pumped a small stream into the wardroom passage below.

 came alongside Astorias starboard bow and, by 0445, took all of the wounded off the heavy cruiser's forecastle. At that point, a small light flashed from Astorias stern, indicating survivors on that part of the ship. Signaling the men on the heavy cruiser's stern that they had been seen, Bagley got underway and rescued men on rafts – some Vincennes survivors – and men who had been driven overboard by the fires blazing aboard Astoria.

With daylight, Bagley returned to the heavy cruiser and came alongside her starboard quarter. Since it appeared that the ship could be saved, a salvage crew of about 325 able-bodied men went back aboard Astoria. Another bucket brigade attacked the fires while the ship's first lieutenant investigated all accessible lower decks. A party of men collected the dead and prepared them for burial.  came up to assist in the salvage effort at about 0700. After securing a towline, Hopkins proceeded ahead, swinging Astoria around in an effort to tow her to the shallow water off Guadalcanal. A second gasoline-powered handy-billy, transferred from Hopkins, promptly joined the struggle against the fires.  soon arrived on the scene, coming alongside the cruiser at about 0900 to pump water into the fire forward. Called away at 1000, Hopkins and Wilson departed, but the heavy cruiser received word that  was on the way to assist in battling the fires and that  was coming to tow the ship.

Sinking
Nevertheless, the fire below decks increased steadily in intensity, and those topside could hear explosions. Her list increased, first to 10° and then 15°. Her stern lowered in the dark waters, and her bow was distinctly rising. All attempts to shore the shell holes – by then below the waterline due to the increasing list – proved ineffective, and the list increased still more. Buchanan arrived at 11:30, but could not approach due to the heavy port list. Directed to stand off the starboard quarter, she stood by while all hands assembled on the stern, which was now wet with seawater. With the port waterway awash at noon, Commodore William G. Greenman gave the order to abandon ship.

Astoria turned over on her port beam, rolled slowly, and settled by the stern, disappearing completely by 12:16. Buchanan lowered two motor whaleboats and, although interrupted by a fruitless hunt for a submarine, came back and assisted the men in the water. Alchiba, which arrived on the scene just before Astoria sank, rescued 32 men. Not one man from the salvage crew lost his life.  Officially, 219 men were reported missing or killed.

Rediscovery
The wreck of USS Astoria was discovered in early 2015 during a sonar mapping project of Iron Bottom Sound led by Microsoft co-founder Paul Allen.

Awards
Astoria earned three battle stars during World War II.

See also
 See List of U.S. Navy losses in World War II for other Navy ships lost in World War II.

References/further information

 

 Roll of Honor

Notes

External links

Navy photographs of Astoria (CA-34)
Website dedicated to USS Astoria

New Orleans-class cruisers
Ships built in Bremerton, Washington
1933 ships
World War II cruisers of the United States
Shipwrecks in Ironbottom Sound
Maritime incidents in August 1942
Shipwreck discoveries by Paul Allen
2015 archaeological discoveries